R. Shanmugam is an Indian politician and former Member of the Legislative Assembly of Tamil Nadu. He was elected to the Tamil Nadu legislative assembly from Tiruttani constituency as an Anna Dravida Munnetra Kazhagam candidate in 1977, 1980, and 1984 elections.

References 

All India Anna Dravida Munnetra Kazhagam politicians
Living people
Year of birth missing (living people)
Tamil Nadu MLAs 1977–1980
Tamil Nadu MLAs 1980–1984
Tamil Nadu MLAs 1985–1989